"Long Away" is a song by the British rock band Queen; it is the third track on their 1976 album A Day at the Races. Brian May wrote the song and sings the lead vocals. It is the only Queen single released during Freddie Mercury's lifetime not to be sung by him, and was released as the third single from the album in North America and New Zealand only.

Recording
It is one of the few songs where May uses a guitar other than his Red Special. For the rhythm guitar parts he used an electric Burns twelve string guitar (although he used the Red Special for the second guitar solo in the middle section of the track). Originally May wanted to use a Rickenbacker guitar (as he admired John Lennon), but he didn't get along well with the Rickenbacker's thin neck.

Roger Taylor sings the highest parts of the song.

Meaning
The song has a sad tone, describing that "for every star in heaven / there's a sad soul here today," and an overall sense of melancholic nostalgia lies over the song. It is similar in feel to the song '39 from A Night at the Opera, although without the folk influence.

Live performances
The song was never performed live with Mercury, though it was rehearsed before the start of the A Day at the Races Tour in January 1977.

Reception
The Washington Post described it as "an affectionate recreation of the mid-'60s Beatles/Byrds sound," and one of the best songs on the album. Wesley Strick of Circus magazine, in a mixed review of the album, named the album's best song and also noted the influence of the Beatles and the Byrds. He observed that Long Away was "haunting" and  "never smart-ass or strickly for laughs, "Long Away" - unlike most of Races - feels real."  Cash Box said that "this gentle tune is built from endless layers of strummed guitars, showcasing the versatile Freddie Mercury's sweetest voice and the group's distinctive high register harmonies."

Other album appearances
The song also appears on two Queen compilation albums: Deep Cuts, Volume 1 (1973–1976) (2011) and Queen Forever (2014).

Band comments on the song

Personnel
Queen 
Brian May – lead and backing vocals, electric guitar
Freddie Mercury – backing vocals
Roger Taylor – drums, backing vocals
John Deacon – bass guitar

References

External links
 Lyrics at Queen official website

Queen (band) songs
1976 songs
1977 singles
Songs written by Brian May
EMI Records singles
Elektra Records singles
Hollywood Records singles